Viborg Fodsports Forening ("Viborg Footsport Association"), or Viborg F.F. and  VFF for short, is a Danish professional football club based in Viborg. The club was founded in 1896 and waited more than a century before winning its only national trophy, the 2000 Danish Cup.

History
Viborg FF was founded in 1896, with several other sports apart from football - among other things were gymnastics, cricket, field hockey, boxing, athletics, skiing, weight-lifting, and wrestling.

The first big sporting highlight of the club came in 1924, when Viborg FF won the championship in Mesterrækken (The Champion Division), which was the best regional division in Jutland. A big title win at the time when, among others, AGF were a dominating club in Jutland.

Following the championship, Viborg dropped somewhat out of the picture, but never more than the club has always been on the Danish footballing map. It was a big relief for the club when it was promotion to the national competitions (4th Division) for the first time in 1959, following many closely missed attempts at qualification. One of the players taking part in the promotion was Erik Bundgaard, whose 421 matches for VFF is still club record.

Except for a couple of seasons in the start of the 1970s, Viborg has not been relegated to a tournament lower than the national competitions since 1959. Though the country's best league have been domicile for Viborg, during the last couple of years the club has been moving up and down between the country's two best leagues.

The finest achievements of the club came in the 1999–2000 season, where the Superliga bronze medals were missed by the smallest margin. Instead, the team was celebrated as winner of the Danish Cup, the DONG Cup. They then added the Danish Super Cup, beating champions Herfølge Boldklub in a penalty shoot out.

In 2021, Viborg finished first in the Danish 1st Division, earning promotion to the top tier. Their first season back in the Superliga was immediately successful, as they qualified for the UEFA Europa Conference League. After knocking out Sūduva and B36 Tórshavn, they eventually lost over two ties against Premier League club West Ham United.

Colours and badge
Viborg F.F.'s colours are green and white.

Stadium
Viborg plays its home matches at Viborg Stadion, which has a capacity of 9,566 spectators, all seated. The biggest stand is the eastern stand (2,792 seats) and the smallest is the southern (2,040 seats). The field size is 105 x 68 m, the same size as the national stadium, Parken. The light is 1200 lux. The sound comes from an Ascon PA-system. There is undersoil heating installed at the venue, which UEFA has approved as an international stadium.

Supporters
Viborg FF has no official fanclub. A former official fanclub is The Green Pride. It was one of the largest in Denmark with over 500 members. There is a small continuation of The Green Pride active in Viborg to this day.

The first ultra group was established in 2002, when a group of young adults established Fanatikos. In 2004 a new group, Shamrock Ultras, was born.

Their main rival is FC Midtjylland and the game is called "Hadets Opgør" (The battle of Hatred) or "det midtjyske derby" (Central Jutland Derby).. Viborg's fans see themselves as being true Central-jutlanders and are annoyed that FCM call themselves FC Midtjylland (FC Central-Jutland).. It's also a battle between modern football and traditional football..

Players

Current squad
As of 31 January 2023

Out on loan

Retired numbers 

22  Søren Frederiksen, Forward, (1989–94, 1995–96, 1998, 2001–05)

Academy

Managerial history

Honours

League
 Danish 1st Division
 Champions: 2020–21

Cup
 Danish Cup
 Winners: 1999–2000
 Danish Super Cup
 Winners: 2000

European record

Recent history
{|class="wikitable"
|-bgcolor="#efefef"
! Season
! 
! Pos.
! Pl.
! W
! D
! L
! GS
! GA
! P
!Cup
!Notes
|-
|1996–97
|SL
|align=right |11
|align=right|33||align=right|6||align=right|11||align=right|16
|align=right|31||align=right|58||align=right|29
||
|Relegated
|-
|1997–98
|1D
|align=right |1
|align=right|30||align=right|20||align=right|7||align=right|3
|align=right|72||align=right|29||align=right|67
||
|Promoted
|-
|1998–99
|SL
|align=right |8
|align=right|33||align=right|13||align=right|5||align=right|15
|align=right|61||align=right|59||align=right|44
||
|
|-
|1999–2000
|SL
|align=right |4
|align=right|33||align=right|15||align=right|7||align=right|11
|align=right|56||align=right|50||align=right|52
|bgcolor=gold|Winners
|
|-
|2000–01
|SL
|align=right |6
|align=right|33||align=right|13||align=right|7||align=right|13
|align=right|52||align=right|42||align=right|46
|bgcolor=cc9966|Semi-final
|
|-
|2001–02
|SL
|align=right |8
|align=right|33||align=right|10||align=right|11||align=right|12
|align=right|46||align=right|45||align=right|41
||Last 16
|
|-
|2002–03
|SL
|align=right |8
|align=right|33||align=right|11||align=right|10||align=right|12
|align=right|58||align=right|55||align=right|43
|bgcolor=cc9966|Semi-final
|
|-
|2003–04
|SL
|align=right |7
|align=right|33||align=right|11||align=right|9||align=right|13
|align=right|47||align=right|44||align=right|42
||Quarter-final
|
|-
|2004–05
|SL
|align=right |7
|align=right|33||align=right|13||align=right|9||align=right|11
|align=right|43||align=right|45||align=right|48
||Fourth round
|
|-
|2005–06
|SL
|align=right |4
|align=right|33||align=right|15||align=right|9||align=right|9
|align=right|62||align=right|43||align=right|54
||Fifth round
|
|-
|2006–07
|SL
|align=right |9
|align=right|33||align=right|8||align=right|5||align=right|20
|align=right|34||align=right|64||align=right|29
|bgcolor=cc9966|Semi-final
|
|-
|2007–08
|SL
|align=right |11
|align=right|33||align=right|5||align=right|5||align=right|23
|align=right|29||align=right|68||align=right|39
||Second round
|Relegated
|-
|2008–09
|1D
|align=right |4
|align=right|30||align=right|17||align=right|3||align=right|10
|align=right|59||align=right|40||align=right|54
|Third round
|
|-
|2009–10
|1D
|align=right |7
|align=right|30||align=right|10||align=right|14||align=right|6
|align=right|30||align=right|26||align=right|44
|Fourth round
|
|-
|2010–11
|1D
|align=right |11
|align=right|30||align=right|9||align=right|6||align=right|15
|align=right|37||align=right|43||align=right|33
|Fourth round
|
|-
|2011–12
|1D
|align=right |4
|align=right|26||align=right|10||align=right|10||align=right|6
|align=right|45||align=right|34||align=right|40
|Fourth round
|
|-
|2012–13
|1D
|align=right |1
|align=right|33||align=right|17||align=right|11||align=right|5
|align=right|60||align=right|30||align=right|62
|Second round
|Promoted
|-
|2013–14
|SL
|align=right |12
|align=right|33||align=right|6||align=right|10||align=right|17
|align=right|38||align=right|63||align=right|28
|Third round
|Relegated
|-
|2014–15
|1D
|align=right |1
|align=right|33||align=right|17||align=right|14||align=right|2
|align=right|47||align=right|20||align=right|65
|First round
|Promoted
|-
|2015–16
|SL
|align=right |8
|align=right|33||align=right|11||align=right|7||align=right|15
|align=right|34||align=right|42||align=right|40
|Fourth round
|
|-
|2016–17
|SL
|align=right |13
|align=right|32||align=right|8||align=right|9||align=right|15
|align=right|35||align=right|47||align=right|33
|Third round
|Relegated
|-
|2017–18
|1D
|align=right |4
|align=right|33||align=right|15||align=right|9||align=right|9
|align=right|58||align=right|42||align=right|54
|Second round
|
|-
|2018–19
|1D
|align=right |2
|align=right|33||align=right|17||align=right|9||align=right|7
|align=right|61||align=right|37||align=right|60
|Second round
|
|-
|2019–20
|1D
|align=right |2
|align=right|33||align=right|17||align=right|8||align=right|8
|align=right|66||align=right|44||align=right|59
|Third round
|
|-
|2020–21
|1D
|align=right |1
|align=right|32||align=right|23||align=right|7||align=right|2
|align=right|71||align=right|24||align=right|76
|Second round
|Promoted
|-
|2021–22
|SL
|align=right |7
|align=right|32||align=right|10||align=right|14||align=right|8
|align=right|45||align=right|43||align=right|44
|Fourth round
|Qualified for 2022-23 UEFA Europa Conference League
|-
|2022–23
|SL
|
|
|
|
|
|-
|}

References

External links 

 Viborg FF - official site
 Viborg FF Fans - official supporter club site

 
Football clubs in Denmark
Association football clubs established in 1896
Fodsports Forening
1896 establishments in Denmark